Mani may refer to:
Bullom So language
A dialect of Mpade
A dialect of Indus Kohistani

See also
 Mani' language (disambiguation)